Connecticut's 27th State Senate district elects one member of the Connecticut State Senate. It encompasses parts of Stamford and Darien. The district has been represented by Democrat Patricia Billie Miller since 2021.

Recent elections

2022

2021 special

2020

2018

2016

2014

2012

References

27